Ando-Kékrénou is a town in central Ivory Coast. It is a sub-prefecture of Béoumi Department in Gbêkê Region, Vallée du Bandama District.

Ando-Kékrénou was a commune until March 2012, when it became one of 1126 communes nationwide that were abolished.

In 2014, the population of the sub-prefecture of Ando-Kékrénou was 12,526.

Villages
The xx villages of the sub-prefecture of Ando-Kékrénou and their population in 2014 2014 are:

Notes

Sub-prefectures of Gbêkê
Former communes of Ivory Coast